Elephants communicate with each other in various ways, including touching, visual displays, vocalisations, seismic vibrations, and semiochemicals.

Tactile

Individual elephant greet each other by stroking or wrapping their trunks; the latter also occurs during mild competition. Older elephants use trunk-slaps, kicks, and shoves to discipline younger ones. Individuals of any age and sex will touch each other's mouths, temporal glands, and genitals, particularly during meetings or when excited. This allows individuals to pick up chemical cues. Touching is especially important for mother–calf communication. When moving, elephant mothers will touch their calves with their trunks or feet when side-by-side or with their tails if the calf is behind them. If a calf wants to rest, it will press against its mother's front legs and when it wants to suckle, it will touch her breast or leg.

Visual
Visual displays mostly occur in agonistic situations. Elephants will try to appear more threatening by raising their heads and spreading their ears. They may add to the display by shaking their heads and snapping their ears, as well as throwing dust and vegetation. They are usually bluffing when performing these actions. Excited elephants may raise their trunks. Submissive ones will lower their heads and trunks, as well as flatten their ears against their necks, while those that accept a challenge will position their ears in a V shape.

Acoustic
Elephants produce several sounds, usually through the larynx, though some may be modified by the trunk. Perhaps the most well-known call is the trumpet which is made by blowing through the trunk. Trumpeting is made during excitement, distress or aggression. Fighting elephants may roar or squeal, and wounded ones may bellow.

Asian elephants are recorded to make three basic sounds: growls, squeaks, and snorts. Growls in their basic form are used for short-distance communication. During mild arousal, growls resonate in the trunk and become rumbles while for long-distance communication, they escalate into roars. Low-frequency growls are infrasonic and made in many contexts. Squeaks come in two forms; chirpings and trumpets. Chirping consists of multiple short squeaks and signal conflict and nervousness. Trumpets are longer squeaks with increased loudness and produced during extreme arousal. Snorts signal changes in activity and increase in loudness during mild or strong arousal. During the latter case, when an elephant bounces the tip of the trunk it creates booms which serve as threat displays.

Infrasound
Elephants can produce infrasonic calls which occur at frequencies less than 20 Hz. Infrasonic calls are important, particularly for long-distance communication, in both Asian and African elephants. For Asian elephants, these calls have a frequency of 14–24 Hz, with sound pressure levels of 85–90 dB and last 10–15 seconds.

At Amboseli National Park several different infrasonic calls have been identified:
Greeting rumble – is emitted by adult females members of a family group that have united after having been separated for several hours.
Contact call – soft, unmodulated sounds made by an individual that has been separated from the groups have .
Contact answer – made in response to the contact call; starts out loud, but softens toward the end.
"Let's go" rumble – a soft rumble emitted by the matriarch to signal to the other herd members that it is time to move to another spot.
Musth rumble – distinctive, low-frequency pulsated rumble emitted by musth males (nicknamed the "motorcycle").
Female chorus – a low-frequency, modulated chorus produced by several cows in response to a musth rumble.
Postcopulatory call – made by an oestrous cow after mating.
Mating pandemonium – calls of excitement made by a cow's family after she has mated.

Anatomy of the vocal tract
The larynx of the elephant is the largest known among mammals. The vocal folds are long and are attached close to the epiglottis base. When comparing an elephant's vocal folds to those of a human, an elephant's are longer, thicker, and have a larger cross-sectional area. In addition, they are tilted at 45 degrees and positioned more anteriorly than a human's vocal folds. From various experiments, the elephant larynx is shown to produce various and complex vibratory phenomena. During in vivo situations, these phenomena could be triggered when the vocal folds and vocal tract interact to raise or lower the fundamental frequency.

One of the vibratory phenomena that occurred inside the larynx is alternating A-P (anterior-posterior) and P-A traveling waves, which happened due to the unusual larynx layout. This can be characterized by its unique glottal opening/closing pattern. When the trachea is at a pressure of approximately 6 kPa, phonation begins in the larynx and the laryngeal tissue starts to vibrate at approximately 15 kPa. Vocal production mechanisms at certain frequencies are similar to that of humans and other mammals and the laryngeal tissues are subjected to self-maintained oscillations. Two biomechanical features can trigger these traveling wave patterns, which are a low fundamental frequency and in the vocal folds, increasing longitudinal tension.

Seismics
Elephants are known to communicate with seismics, vibrations produced by impacts on the earth's surface or acoustical waves that travel through it. They appear to rely on their leg and shoulder bones to transmit the signals to the middle ear. When detecting seismic signals, the animals lean forward and put more weight on their larger front feet; this is known as the "freezing behaviour". Elephants possess several adaptations suited for seismic communication. The cushion pads of the feet contain cartilaginous nodes and have similarities to the acoustic fat found in marine mammals such as toothed whales and sirenians. A unique sphincter-like muscle around the ear canal constricts the passageway, thereby dampening acoustic signals and allowing the animal to hear more seismic signals.

Elephants appear to use seismics for a number of purposes. An individual running or mock charging can create seismic signals that can be heard at great distances. When detecting the seismics of an alarm call signalling danger from predators, elephants enter a defensive posture and family groups will pack together. Seismic waveforms produced by locomotion appear to travel distances of up to  while those from vocalisations travel .

Semiochemicals
Elephants can also communicate through olfaction and semiochemicals. Secretion of semiochemicals can occur through feces and urine as well as the temporal gland, a structure that is derived from sweat glands and located on both sides of the head of male and female elephants. The substance secreted by male elephants from their temporal glands during musth contains many chemicals and seems to be of interest to females. Elephants may investigate and detected semiochemicals through the vomeronasal organ (VNO). Elephants may go through several steps of investigating the smell of a surface with their trunk before inserting its tip into their mouth to touch the anterior part of their hard palate and thus transfer semiochemicals to the VNO.

References

External links
 ElephantVoices

Animal communication
Elephants
Articles containing video clips